United Nations Security Council Resolution 371, adopted on July 24, 1975, recalling statements from officials of the Arab Republic of Egypt and a report by the Secretary-General regarding the United Nations Emergency Force, the Council expressed its concern at the lack of progress toward a lasting peace in the Middle East.

The Council then called upon all involved parties to implement resolution 338, it renewed the mandate for the Emergency Force for another 3 months until October 24, 1975, and requested that the Secretary-General submit a report on any progress regarding the situation before the expiration of the renewed mandate.

The resolution was adopted by 13 votes; China and Iraq did not participate in the voting.

See also
 Arab–Israeli conflict
 List of United Nations Security Council Resolutions 301 to 400 (1971–1976)

References
Text of the Resolution at undocs.org

External links
 

 0371
 0371
Arab–Israeli peace process
 0371
July 1975 events